Xenagoras was a Greek historian from Heraclea Pontica quoted by Dionysius of Halicarnassus, from whom we learn that Xenagoras wrote that Odysseus and Circe had three sons, Rhomos, Anteias, and Ardeas, who founded the three cities which were called by their names. He wrote a work titled Chronicle (Χρόνοι), and another on islands (Περὶ νήσων). The 5th century writer Macrobius also refers to the third book of the history of Xenagoras.

This Xenagoras was possibly the same Xenagoras as father of the historian Nymphis.

Notes

Ancient Greek historians
2nd-century BC Greek people
2nd-century BC historians
2nd-century BC writers